Four Horsemen of the Apocalypse is an 1887 painting by Russian artist Viktor Vasnetsov.

The painting depicts the Four Horsemen of the Apocalypse described in the Book of Revelation. The Lamb of God is visible at the top.

References

1887 paintings
Russian paintings
Symbolist paintings
Four Horsemen of the Apocalypse in popular culture
Paintings based on the Book of Revelation